Europa is a musical duo created by DJ Jax Jones and Martin Solveig in 2019. Jones teased the formation of Europa as well as their first track on Twitter on the 26 March 2019. It was released later the same year titled "All Day and Night" wherein the artists collaborated with Madison Beer as the featuring artist. It would go on to feature in Jones' album, Snacks (Supersize). The duo created their second single with Raye titled "Tequila" in February 2020, which was released as a non-album single.

Background 
In an interview with Capital FM, Jones talked about the beginning of the project. He jokingly remarked that it was, "born out of a mutual admiration and cemented by a hug". He also revealed that it all started when Martin invited him to a play and their friendship developed, which led to the formation of the group.

Discography

Singles

Notes

References	

Electronic dance music duos
Electronic music supergroups
Male musical duos